Trouble Sleeping is an unreleased psychological thriller film written and directed by Robert Adetuyi and starring Billy Zane, Vanessa Angel, Fred Stoller,  Rick Otto, Ingrid Eskeland, and Kale Clauson.

Plot
Trouble Sleeping is a psychological thriller about Vanessa, a middle-aged woman, haunted by the ghost of her late husband. Her stepson has just been released from a mental institution - four years ago he discovered his father's body, shot in the head, a supposed suicide. Now he's returning home and will inherit his late father's estate on his twenty-first birthday. However, Vanessa and her new younger husband have no intention of letting Justin get his hands on the money.

Cast
 Billy Zane as Charles
 Vanessa Angel as Vanessa
 Fred Stoller as Dr. Gilbert
 Rick Otto as Alex
 Ingrid Eskeland as August
 Kale Clauson as Justin
 Joel Polis as Jack McKay

Production
The film was produced by Greg Mckay, Roger Fex, and Linda Eskeland.

References

External links
 Trouble Sleeping at the Internet Movie Database
 http://www.troublesleepingthemovie.com/

Unreleased films
Unreleased American films
American psychological thriller films
Canadian psychological thriller films
English-language Canadian films
Films directed by Robert Adetuyi